Austrian Americans are Americans of Austrian descent, chiefly German-speaking Catholics and Jews. According to the 2000 U.S. census, there were 735,128 Americans of full or partial Austrian descent, accounting for 0.3% of the population. The states with the largest Austrian American populations are New York (93,083), California (84,959), Pennsylvania (58,002) (most of them in the Lehigh Valley), Florida (54,214), New Jersey (45,154), and Ohio (27,017).

This may be an undercount since many German Americans, Czech Americans, Polish Americans, Slovak Americans, and Ukrainian Americans, and other Americans with Central European ancestry can trace their roots from the Habsburg territories of Austria, the Austrian Empire, or Cisleithania in the Austro-Hungarian Empire, regions which were major sources of immigrants to the United States before World War I, and whose inhabitants often assimilated into larger immigrant and ethnic communities throughout the United States.

Migration History

Early Migrations 
The Austrian migration to the U.S. probably started in 1734, when a group of 50 families from the city of Salzburg, Austria, migrated to the newly founded Georgia. Having a Protestant background, they migrated because of Catholic repression in their country.

In the first fifty years of the 19th century many more Austrians emigrated to the United States, although the number of Austrian emigrants did not exceed a thousand people. Prior to the year 1918, the precise number of Austrians who emigrated to the U.S. is unknown since Austria was part of the Austro-Hungarian Empire, so the U.S. Census recorded the number of people from all over the empire in the same group (the Austro-Hungarian group).

In this period, the Austrians of the United States received religious education thanks to the arrival of 100 to 200 Catholic priests from Germany and Austria. Those religious had been sent by the Leopoldine Stiftung, an Austrian organization that was founded for help both to the Austrians emigrated and the Native Americans, and they monitored their religious education in places such as Illinois, Iowa, Michigan, Pennsylvania and Louisiana. Most of the emigrants were Tyroleans who lacked of lands or that fled the Metternich regime, who used repression to control the population. The political refugees were mostly anticlerical and against slavery. They were liberals and adapted quickly to their new country.

The immigration of Austrians increased during the second half of 19th century, and in 1900 had 275,000 Austrians living in the United States. Many Austrians worked in the United States as miners and servants. Many Austrians settled in New York City, Pittsburgh, and Chicago. Since 1880, when a great wave of emigration started from all over Europe, Austrians also emigrated massively to the United States, looking for new agricultural land on which to work because as the Austrian Empire was undergoing industrialization, fields were being replaced by cities. However, the same was happening in the western United States. From 1901 to 1910 alone, Austrians were one of the ten most significant immigrant groups in the United States, with more than 2.1 million Austrians. Scholarly research on this topic is growing, in the Journal of Austrian-American History and elsewhere.

Most of these newly immigrated Austrians were cosmopolitan and were left-wing. They found employment in Chicago stockyards and in Pennsylvania, in jobs related to cement and steel factories. Many of them, more than 35 percent, returned to Austria with the savings that they had made by their employment.

20th Century 
In 1914–1938, Austrian immigration was low, until it slowed to a trickle during the years of the Depression. Between 1919 and 1924, fewer than 20,000 Austrians emigrated to the North American country, mainly from Burgenland. Also, laws restricting emigration to the U.S., imposed by the Austrian government, limited Austrian emigration further, reducing it to only 1,413 persons per year.

World War II & Post-War Migrations 
However, since the late 1930s, many other Austrians migrated to the United States. Most of them were Jews fleeing the Nazi persecution which started with the Annexation of Austria in 1938. In 1941, some 29,000 Jewish Austrians had emigrated to the United States. Most of them were doctors, lawyers, architects and artists (such as composers, writers, and stage and film directors). Much later, between 1945 and 1960, some 40,000 Austrians emigrated to the United States.

Present Day 
Since the 1960s, however, Austrian immigration has been very small, mostly because Austria is now a developed nation, where poverty and political oppression are scarce. According to the 1990 U.S. census, 948,558 people identified their origins in Austria. Most of the present-day immigrants who currently live in the United States who were born in Austria identify themselves as being of Austrian ancestry, but the percentage who identify themselves as being of German ancestry is larger than the one expected on the basis of the opinion polls in Austria. According to the United States Census Bureau, in 2015, there were 26,603 individuals living in the U.S. born in Austria who identified themselves as being of Austrian ancestry. By contrast, in the same year, there were 6,200 individuals living in the U.S. born in Austria who identified themselves as being of German ancestry. Most of the immigrants from South Tyrol in Italy to the United States identify themselves as being of German rather than Austrian ancestry. According to the United States Census Bureau, in 2015, there were 365 individuals living in the U.S. born in Italy who identified themselves as being of Austrian ancestry. By contrast, in the same year, there were 1040 individuals living in the U.S. born in Italy who identified themselves as being of German ancestry.

Assimilation 
Austrian immigrants adapted quickly to American society because the Austro-Hungarian Empire had also been a melting pot of many cultures and languages. On the other hand, despite the rejection that Austrians feel toward the behavior of the Germans, regarded by Austrians as less tolerants and cosmopolitans, they have suffered the same damages and discrimination that German immigrants have faced in the United States. They were considered by Americans to be the same because of their language and both world wars. Most Austrian Americans speak American English and German (the official language of Austria).

Religion
Most Austrians are Roman Catholic. The Austrian contribution in the 19th century in evangelizing Native Americans is remarkable. However, in the 19th century, Austrians also had to work with Irish Catholic priests, who spoke English and rejected them, to baptize the Natives and convert them to Catholicism. Thus, the Leopoldine Society sent money and priests to North America and led to the creation of over 400 churches on the East Coast, in the Midwest, and in the Indian Countries, located west of those areas. It was especially prominent in cities such as in Cincinnati and St. Louis. The Benedictines and Franciscans also  built thousands of congregations.

However, the expansion of Catholicism conducted by Austrian priests caused a rejection of American society, as it could change the religious balance in the country. Therefore, for a long time, Austrians once again had to struggle to adapt to American life. The 20th century reduced the religiosity of the average Austrian American, as other Americans.

The emigration of other religious groups from Austria to the United States, especially the Jews from Vienna after 1938, has also contributed to strengthen religious variety in the United States.  Isidor Bush (1822–98) emigrated from Vienna in 1849 and became a leading Jewish citizen of the city of St. Louis and the state of Missouri through his business ventures, religious work, and political activities. His vineyards were famous and profitable.

Austrian-American Communities in the United States
The U.S. communities with the highest percentage of self-professed Austrian Americans are:

U.S. communities with the most residents born in Austria
The U.S. communities where born Austrians make up more than 1% of the total population are:

 Hillside Lake, New York 1.4%
 Redway, California 1.3%
 Black Diamond, Florida 1.2%
 Smallwood, New York 1.2%
 Highland Beach, Florida 1.2%
 Cordova, Maryland 1.2%
 Keystone, Colorado 1.2%
 North Lynbrook, New York 1.1%
 Cedar Glen Lakes, New Jersey 1.1%
 Center City, Minnesota 1.1%
 Scotts Corners, New York 1.0%
 Killington, Vermont 1.0%
 Lexington, New York 1.0%
 Tuxedo Park, New York 1.0%

Notable people

Entertainment 
Woody Allen – (born Allan Stewart Konigsberg) actor, director, screenwriter, comedian, author, playwright, and musician
Gabrielle Anwar – actress
Adele Astaire – dancer, actress, sister of Fred Astaire
Fred Astaire – dancer, actor
Sean Astin – actor
Bibi Besch – actress
Theodore Bikel – actor, singer, musician
Peter Bogdanovich – director, writer, actor, producer, critic and film historian
Hans Conried – actor
Ricardo Cortez – silent film actor, of Austrian Jewish descent
Stanley Cortez – cinematographer
Billy Crystal – actor, comedian
Robert von Dassanowsky – academic, writer and film producer
Daniel DeWeldon – actor, son of Felix de Weldon
Max Fleischer – animator
Richard Fleischer – director, son of Max Fleischer
Teri Garr – actress, comedian, dancer and voice artist
Jeff Goldblum – actor
Alex Hafner – actor
Mark Harmon – actor
Kurt Kasznar – Austrian born American actor
Stanley Kubrick – director, producer, screenwriter
Hedy Lamarr – actress, inventor, and producer; from an Austrian Jewish family
Elissa Landi – actress
Fritz Lang – director
Peter Lorre – actor
Joe Manganiello – actor, grandmother was of Austrian descent
Samantha Mathis – actress, daughter of Bibi Besch
Paul Muni – actor
Arthur Murray – dancer, entrepreneur
Emily Osment – actress, sister of Haley Joel
Haley Joel Osment – actor, brother of Emily
Natalie Portman – actress, born to a Jewish family, some of whom came from Austria
Otto Preminger – director
Leah Remini – actress, mother has Austrian Jewish descent
Don Rickles – actor and comedian, of Jewish descent
Fritzi Scheff – actress
Joseph Schildkraut – actor
Arnold Schwarzenegger – actor and 38th Governor of California
Patrick Schwarzenegger – actor, son of Arnold, brother of Katherine Schwarzenegger
Harry Shearer – actor
Lilia Skala – actress
Walter Slezak – actor
Eric Stonestreet – actor, original family name before World War I was Steingassner
Edgar G. Ulmer – director
Erich von Stroheim – director
Josef von Sternberg – director
Tessa Gräfin von Walderdorff – American socialite, writer, and actress who is a member of the Austrian noble family Walderdorff
Billy Wilder – director, of Jewish descent
Shelley Winters – actress, of Jewish descent
Elijah Wood – actor
Fred Zinnemann – director

Science and Medicine 
Godfrey Edward Arnold – medical doctor and researcher
Bruno Bettelheim – child psychologist, psychoanalyst and concentration camp survivor
Carl Djerassi – chemist, novelist, and playwright
Kurt Gödel – logician, mathematician, philosopher
Friedrich von Hayek – Austrian-born economist and philosopher
Hans Holzer – paranormal researcher and author
Heinz von Foerster – scientist combining physics and philosophy, originator of Second-order cybernetics
Eric Kandel – neuroscientist
Karl Landsteiner – biologist and physician, best known for having distinguished the main blood groups
Ludwig Heinrich Edler von Mises – economist, philosopher, author and classical liberal
Ignatz Leo Nascher – doctor and gerontologist
Wilhelm Reich – psychiatrist
Wolfgang Pauli – physicist
Alfred Schütz – philosopher/sociologist
Joseph Warkany – pediatrician
Paul Watzlawick – psychologist, communications theorist, and philosopher 
Victor Frederick Weisskopf – physicist of Jewish descent. During World War II, he worked at Los Alamos on the Manhattan Project to develop the atomic bomb, and later campaigned against the proliferation of nuclear weapons; medal received in 1979

Music 
Walter Arlen – composer, music critic at the Los Angeles Times
Victor L. Berger – socialist politician and journalist
Peter L. Berger – sociologist
Gustav Bergmann – philosopher
Edward Bernays – Austrian-American pioneer in public relations, referred to in his obituary as "the father of public relations".

Elmer Bernstein – composer
Erich Wolfgang Korngold – composer
Erich Leinsdorf – conductor
Bobby Schayer – musician
Arnold Schoenberg – composer, of Jewish descent
Max Steiner – composer
Nita Strauss – rock guitarist
Georg Ludwig von Trapp – headed the Austrian singing family portrayed in The Sound of Music. His exploits at sea in World War I earned him numerous decorations.
Agathe von Trapp – eldest daughter of Baron Georg von Trapp and Agathe Whitehead von Trapp, The von Trapp Family from The Sound of Music
Maria F. von Trapp – second-oldest daughter of Baron Georg von Trapp and Agathe Whitehead von Trapp, The von Trapp Family from The Sound of Music
Werner von Trapp – second-oldest son of Georg Ritter von Trapp and Agathe Whitehead von Trapp, The von Trapp Family from The Sound of Music
Joe Zawinul – jazz pianist

Arts & Literature 

 Maria Altmann – art collector

Bela Borsodi – photographer
Eric de Kolb – painter and designer
Felix de Weldon – sculptor, best known for the Marine Corps War Memorial
Jerry Iger – famed American cartoonist, founder of Eisner & Iger, an industry trailblazer during the Golden Age of Comics; born to an Austrian-Jewish family in New York City and Bob Iger's paternal great-uncle
David Karfunkle – painter, muralist
Greta Kempton – artist
Joseph Keppler – cartoonist, best known for the illustrated magazine Puck
Vivian Maier – street photographer
Sylvia Plath – poet, mother of Austrian descent
Katherine Schwarzenegger – author, daughter of Arnold Schwarzenegger, sister of Patrick Schwarzenegger
Victor Gruen - architect and designer of shopping malls

Law and Politics 
Henry Ellenbogen – U.S. Congressman from Pennsylvania
Felix Frankfurter – U.S. Supreme Court Justice

Fred F. Herzog – only Jewish judge in Austria between the world wars, he fled to America and became Dean of two different law schools
Raul Hillberg – political scientist and historian, who is widely considered to be one of the world's preeminent scholars of the Holocaust
Hans Kelsen – jurist
John Kerry – politician, current United States Special PresidentialEnvoy for Climate, former Senator from Massachusetts, U.S. presidential candidate of 2004 (D), former U.S. Secretary of State
Jack Kirby – artist
Richard Neutra – architect
Frederick Burr Opper – cartoonist
Kurt von Schuschnigg – Austrofascist politician and Austrian federal Chancellor 1936-1938 and professor of political sciences at St. Louis University 1948-1967
Ernst Florian Winter – diplomat

Business and Technology 
Michael Eisner – media executive, successive CEO of Paramount Pictures and the Walt Disney Corporation
Anselm Franz – pioneering turbojet engineer, designer of the Jumo 004 and Lycoming T53 engines
Bob Iger – longtime CEO of the Walt Disney Corporation, who oversaw a fourfold increase in its market capitalization; born in New York City to a Jewish family, in particular an Austrian-Jewish father
Travis Kalanick – founder, Uber Technologies; born in California to a family of Jewish-Austrian and Slovak-Austrian extraction
Ernst Mahler – chemist and industrialist
Wolfgang Puck – celebrity chef, restaurateur
Martin Roscheisen – entrepreneur

Sports 
Corey Kluber – Major League Baseball pitcher, 2014 Cy Young pitcher

Joe Schilling – kickboxer
Mose Solomon – "Rabbi of Swat", Major League Baseball player, of Jewish descent
Eliot Teltscher – top-10 tennis player
Ken Uston – blackjack player, strategist, and author

Journalism 
Gene Siskel – critic, journalist
Michael Smerconish – CNN journalist
Matthew Winter – journalist
Matthew Karnitschnig - journalist

See also
Austria–United States relations
European American
German Americans
Czech Texan
Hyphenated American
Journal of Austrian-American History

References

Further reading
 Jones, J. Sydney. "Austrian Americans." Gale Encyclopedia of Multicultural America, edited by Thomas Riggs, (3rd ed., vol. 1, Gale, 2014), pp. 189–202. online
 Pochmann, Henry A. German Culture in America: Philosophical and Literary Influences 1600–1900 (1957). 890pp; comprehensive review of German influence on Americans esp 19th century. online
 Pochmann, Henry A. and  Arthur R. Schult.  Bibliography of German Culture in America to 1940 (2nd ed 1982); massive listing, but no annotations.
 Spaulding, E. Wilder. The Quiet Invaders: The Story of the Austrian Impact upon America (Vienna: Österreichische Bundesverlag, 1968).
 Thernstrom, Stephen, ed. Harvard Encyclopedia of American Ethnic Groups (1980) pp 164–170. Online free to borrow

External links
   Austrian Cultural Institute Forum New York
    Botstiber Foundation
Euroamericans.net: Austrians in America
USAustrians.com: Austrians in America

American people of Austrian descent
Austrian diaspora
Austrian diaspora in North America
Austrian American
European-American society